.gr is the country code top-level domain (ccTLD) for Greece. Registrations are processed via accredited registrars and domain names in Greek characters may also be registered.

Second level domains

There are five official second level domains:

 com.gr: for those engaging in commercial activities.
 edu.gr: for educational institutions.
 net.gr: Internet Service Providers (ISPs) and network providers.
 org.gr: non-profit organizations.
 gov.gr: exclusively for governmental organizations.

There are some other unofficial second level domains that belong to registrars offering third level domain name registrations.

 mil.gr: Exclusively for military purposes.
 mod.gr: Ministry of Defence
 sch.gr: local education authorities, schools, primary and secondary education, community education.
 co.gr: for commercial use (generally not as widely used as .com.gr).

Alternative top domain
Greece applied for the internationalized country code top-level domain (IDN ccTLD) .ελ (.ΕΛ in capital letters) for domain names composed of letters of the Greek alphabet. This was turned down by ICANN in April 2011 because it was too visually similar to .EA in Latin letters should ICANN ever implement such a TLD (EA is an exceptionally reserved ISO 3166-1 alpha-2 code element for Ceuta & Melilla).

In 2014, ICANN decided to allow Greece to have the domain .ελ. The right to this top-level domain was handed over to Greece in October 2015, and it became operational on the Internet on 10 July 2018.

For the first three months, domains already held under .gr as they already were in Latin or Greek letters or transcribed into Greek characters could be obtained for .ελ only by the holder of that .gr domain. Those restrictions ceased to exist in October 2018.

References

External links
 IANA .gr whois information
 .gr registry website
 Whois for .gr domain names
 co.gr registration policies

Country code top-level domains
Internet in Greece
Council of European National Top Level Domain Registries members
Computer-related introductions in 1989

sv:Toppdomän#G